Melbourne is a 2014 Iranian drama film written and directed by Nima Javidi, starring Payman Maadi and Negar Javaherian. it was premiered at the 32nd Fajr International Film Festival in Iran. the film won the Golden Pyramid Award for "Best Film in the International Competition" at the 36th Cairo International Film Festival.

Critical reception

Awards and nominations

References

External links
 
 

Iranian drama films
Films directed by Nima Javidi
2010s Persian-language films
Films about child death